Please add names of notable painters with a Wikipedia page, in precise English alphabetical order, using U.S. spelling conventions. Country and regional names refer to where painters worked for long periods, not to personal allegiances.

Jean Xceron (1890–1967), American painter
Xi Gang (奚岡, 1746–1803), Chinese painter and seal carver
Xia Chang (夏昶, 1388–1470), Chinese painter and government official
Xia Gui (夏珪, fl. 1195–1224), Chinese painter
Xia Shuwen (夏叔文, fl. 14th or 15th century), Chinese painter
Xia Yong (夏永, fl. mid-14th century), Chinese painter
Xiang Shengmo (項聖謨, 1597–1658), Chinese painter
Xiao Yuncong (蕭雲從, 1596–1673), Chinese painter, calligrapher and poet
Xie He (謝赫, 6th century), Chinese painter, writer and art historian
Xie Huan (謝環, fl. 1426–1452), Chinese painter
Xie Shichen (謝時臣, born 1488), Chinese painter
Xie Sun (謝蓀, fl. between 17th and 19th centuries), Chinese painter
Xu Beihong (徐悲鴻, 1895–1953), Chinese shuimohua painter
Xu Wei (徐渭, 1521–1593), Chinese painter, poet and dramatist
Xu Xi (徐熙, died pre-975), Chinese painter
Xuande Emperor (宣德帝, 1398–1435), Chinese painter and emperor

References
References can be found under each entry.

X